George Himes Park is a  public park in southwest Portland, Oregon. The space was acquired in 1903.

References

1903 establishments in Oregon
Hillsdale, Portland, Oregon
Parks in Portland, Oregon